Michael William "Ross" King (11 June 1943 – 28 June 2016) was an Australian rules footballer who played with Fitzroy in the Victorian Football League (VFL) and East Perth in the West Australian Football League (WAFL).

Notes

External links 

Ross King's playing statistics from WAFL Footy Facts

1943 births
2016 deaths
Australian rules footballers from Western Australia
Fitzroy Football Club players
East Perth Football Club players